Boutte is a census-designated place (CDP) in St. Charles Parish, Louisiana, United States. The population was 3,075 at the 2010 census, and 3,054 in 2020.

Geography
Boutte is located at  (29.901060, -90.386434).

Demographics 

As of the 2020 United States census, there were 3,054 people, 1,080 households, and 838 families residing in the CDP.

Education
St. Charles Parish Public School System operates public schools:
R. J. Vial Elementary School (grades 3-5) in Paradis - Opened in 1975
J. B. Martin Middle School (grades 6-8) in Paradis
Hahnville High School in Boutte

Notable people
Alfred Blue - NFL running back
Garland Robinette - Journalist and news anchor

References

Census-designated places in Louisiana
Census-designated places in St. Charles Parish, Louisiana
Census-designated places in New Orleans metropolitan area